An Airy beam, is a propagation invariant wave whose main intensity lobe propagates along a curved parabolic trajectory while being resilient to perturbations (self-healing).

Physical description
A cross section of an ideal Airy beam would reveal an area of principal intensity, with a series of adjacent, less luminous areas trailing off to infinity. In reality, the beam is truncated so as to have a finite composition.

As the beam propagates, it does not diffract, i.e., does not spread out. The Airy beam also has the characteristic of freely accelerating. As it propagates, it bends so as to form a parabolic arc.

History
The term "Airy beam" derives from the Airy integral, developed in the 1830s by Sir George Biddell Airy to explain optical caustics such as those appearing in a rainbow.

The Airy waveform was first theorized in 1979 by M. V. Berry and Nándor L. Balázs. They demonstrated a nonspreading Airy wave packet solution to the Schrödinger equation.
 
In 2007 researchers from the University of Central Florida (United States) were able to create and observe an Airy beam for the first time in both one- and two-dimensional configurations. The members of the team were Georgios Siviloglou, John Broky, Aristide Dogariu, and Demetrios Christodoulides.

In one-dimension, the Airy beam is the only exactly shape-preserving accelerating solution to the free-particle Schrödinger equation (or 2D paraxial wave equation). However, in two dimensions (or 3D paraxial systems), two separable solutions are possible: two-dimensional Airy beams and accelerating parabolic beams. Furthermore, it has been shown that any function on the real line can be mapped to an accelerating beam with a different transverse shape.

In 2009 accelerating "Airy like" beams have been observed for the first time in material, notably a system with optical nonlinear behaviour, by a joint team of Pavia University and L'Aquila University (Italy); the members of the team were Jacopo Parravicini, Paolo Minzioni, Vittorio Degiorgio (from Pavia), and Eugenio DelRe  (from L'Aquila). Subsequently, this kind of beams has been investigated in 2011 and 2012 mainly by the teams of University of Central Florida. Later, Airy beams have been demonstrated for other types of equations such as Helmholtz equation, Maxwell's equations. Acceleration can also take place along a radial instead of a cartesian coordinate, which is the case of circular-Airy abruptly autofocusing waves and their extension to arbitrary (nonparabolic) caustics. Acceleration is possible even for non-homogeneous periodic systems. With careful engineering of the input waveform, light can be made to accelerate along arbitrary trajectories in media that possess discrete or continuous periodicity. 
In 2018, researchers from Tel-Aviv university measured the cubic phase of Airy beams in an analogous system of surface gravity water-waves. They also managed to accelerate the Airy beam analog, using an external hydrodynamic linear potential and stop the self-accelerating front of the Airy beam. The members of the team associated with the experiment were Georgi Gary Rozenman, Ady Arie and Lev Shemer.

Mathematical description
The potential free Schrödinger equation:

Has the following Airy accelerating solution:

where

  is the Airy function.
  is the electric field envelope
  represents a dimensionless transverse coordinate
  is an arbitrary transverse scale
  is a normalized propagation distance
 
This solution is non-diffracting in a parabolic accelerating frame. Actually one can perform a coordinate transformation and get an Airy equation. In the new coordinates the equation is solved by the Airy function.

Experimental observation

Georgios Sivilioglou, et al. successfully fabricated an Airy beam in 2007. A beam with a Gaussian distribution was modulated by a spatial light modulator to have an Airy distribution. The result was recorded by a CCD camera.

Modified Airy beams

Attenuation-compensation 
Beams may encounter losses as they travel through materials which will cause attenuation of the beam intensity. A property common to non-diffracting (or propagation-invariant) beams, such as the Airy beam and Bessel beam, is the ability to control the longitudinal intensity envelope of the beam without significantly altering the other characteristics of the beam. This can be used to create Airy beams which grow in intensity at they travel and can be used to counteract losses, therefore maintaining a beam of constant intensity as it propagates. In temporal domain, an analogous modified dispersion-free attenuation-compensating Airy-based ("rocket") pulse was previously proposed and demonstrated in, designed to compensate media losses as it propagates through dispersive media.

Applications

Optical trapping and manipulation 
Researchers at the University of St. Andrews have used Airy beams to manipulate small particles, moving them along curves and around corners. This may find use in fields such as microfluidic engineering and cell biology. 
Significant theoretical works have been also undertaken by F.G. Mitri and his collaborators both in optics and acoustics, and related works can be found in these references: Airy acoustical–sheet spinner tweezers; Acoustics of finite asymmetric exotic beams: Examples of Airy and fractional Bessel beams; Pulling and spinning reversal of a sub-wavelength absorptive sphere in adjustable vector Airy light-sheets; Adjustable vector Airy light-sheet single optical tweezers: negative radiation forces on a subwavelength spheroid and spin torque reversal; Optical radiation force on a dielectric sphere of arbitrary size illuminated by a linearly polarized Airy light-sheet; Optical torque on an absorptive dielectric sphere of arbitrary size illuminated by a linearly-polarized Airy light-sheet; Circularly-polarized Airy light-sheet spinner tweezers and particle transport

(see also: Optical tweezers)

Imaging and microscopy 
Researchers at the University of St. Andrews have further utilised Airy beams to make a large field of view (FOV) while maintaining high axial contrast in a light-sheet microscope. This technique has been adapted to use multi-photon excitation and attenuation-compensated Airy beams to achieve imaging at greater depths within biological specimens.

Micro-machining 
The accelerating and diffraction-free features of the Airy wavepacket have also been utilized by researchers at the University of Crete to produce two-dimensional, circular-Airy waves, termed abruptly-autofocusing beams. These beams tend to focus in an abrupt fashion shortly before a target while maintaining a constant and low intensity profile along the propagated path and can be useful in laser microfabrication or medical laser treatments.

See also
Bessel beam

Notes and references 

Wave analysis of Airy beams

Wave mechanics
Laser science